The Stavisky affair was a financial scandal in France in 1934, involving embezzler Alexandre Stavisky. The scandal had political ramifications for the Radical Socialist moderate government of the time when it was revealed that Prime Minister Camille Chautemps had protected Stavisky, who died suddenly in mysterious circumstances. Political rightists engaged in large anti-government demonstrations on 6 February 1934, resulting in Paris police firing upon and killing fifteen demonstrators. A right-wing coup d'état seemed like a possibility at the time, but historians agree that the multiple rightist forces were uncoordinated and not trying to overthrow the government.

Stavisky
Serge Alexandre Stavisky (1888–1934), who became known as le beau Sacha ("Handsome Sasha"), was a Russian Jew born in modern-day Ukraine whose parents had relocated to France. Stavisky tried various professions, working as a café singer, a nightclub manager, a soup factory worker, and as the operator of a gambling den. During the 1930s he managed municipal pawnshops in Bayonne but also knew financial people. Stavisky sold worthless bonds and financed his "hockshop" on the surety of what he called the emeralds of the late Empress of Germany—which were revealed later to be glass.

Stavisky maintained his reputation by using his acquaintances with important people. If a newspaper tried to investigate his affairs, he paid them to stop, either with large advertisement contracts or by buying the newspaper's company.

In 1927 Stavisky was put on trial for fraud for the first time. However, the trial was postponed repeatedly and he was granted bail nineteen times. Stavisky probably continued his scams during this time. One judge who claimed to have secret documents involving Stavisky was later found decapitated. Janet Flanner wrote: 
The scheme which finally killed Alexandre Stavisky, his political guests' reputations, and the uninvited public's peace of mind, was his emission of hundreds of millions of francs' worth of false bonds on the city of Bayonne's municipal pawnshop, which were bought up by life-insurance companies, counseled by the Minister of Colonies, who was counseled by the Minister of Commerce, who was counseled by the Mayor of Bayonne, who was counseled by the little manager of the hockshop, who was counseled by Stavisky.

At risk of exposure in December 1933, Stavisky fled. On 8 January 1934, the police found him in a chalet in Chamonix, dying from a gunshot wound. Stavisky was officially determined to have committed suicide, but there was a persistent speculation that police officers had killed him. Fourteen Parisian newspapers reported his death as a suicide, but eight did not. The distance the bullet had traveled caused the newspaper Le Canard enchaîné to propose sarcastically that Stavisky had "a long arm".

Political crisis of 6 February 1934
After Stavisky's death, details about his long criminal history, his relations with the French establishment, and his controversial death became public. His involvement with so many ministers caused the resignation of Premier Camille Chautemps amidst accusations from the right-wing opposition that he and his police had killed Stavisky intentionally to protect influential people. When Chautemps was replaced by Édouard Daladier, one of his first acts was to dismiss the prefect of the Paris police, Jean Chiappe, notorious for his rightist sympathies and suspected of encouraging previous anti-government demonstrations. Daladier then dismissed the director of the Comédie Française, who had been staging William Shakespeare's controversial play Coriolanus, and replaced him with the director of the Sûreté-Générale, a protege' of Chautemps and Daladier's centre-leftist Radical Socialist Party. He also appointed a new Interior Minister, Eugène Frot, who announced that demonstrators would be shot.

The dismissal of Chiappe was the immediate cause of the 6 February 1934 crisis, which some considered as a possible rightist putsch. According to historian Joel Colton, "The consensus among scholars is that there was no concerted or unified design to seize power and that the police lacked the coherence, unity, or leadership to accomplish such an end." The historian of fascism, René Rémond, described it as "barely a riot ... a street demonstration".

However, leftists feared an overt fascist conspiracy. Fomented by several conservative, anti-Semitic, monarchist, or fascist groups, including Action Française, the Croix-de-Feu and the Mouvement Franciste, the demonstration occurred on the night of 6–7 February 1934. The police fired upon and killed fifteen demonstrators. Daladier was forced to resign. His successor was conservative Gaston Doumergue, who formed a coalition government. It was the first time during the Third Republic that a government had to resign owing to oppositional rioters. Other results were the formation of anti-fascism leagues and an alliance between the Section française de l'Internationale ouvrière (SFIO, a socialist party) and the French Communist Party, which resulted in the 1936 Popular Front.

Further consequences
The scandal involved a remarkable range of people from politics, wealthy society and the literary-intellectual elite of Paris. Mistinguett was asked why she had been photographed with Stavisky at a nightclub; Georges Simenon reported on the affair and Stavisky's ex-bodyguard threatened him with physical violence; Colette, referring to the alleged inability of any of Stavisky's important friends to remember him, described the dead con-artist as "a man with no face".

A trial of twenty people associated with Stavisky began in 1935. Printed charges were 1200 pages long. All of the accused, including Stavisky's widow, two deputies, and one general, were acquitted the next year. The amount defrauded was estimated to be the equivalent of $18 million at then prevailing exchange rates plus an additional $54 million that came within months of being attained. The location of Stavisky's wealth is still unknown.

The Stavisky Affair left France weakened internally. The country remained divided politically for the rest of the decade, but the political weaknesses it exposed and exacerbated were not confined to France. The Affair was emblematic of a more general decrease of popularity of democratic values and institutions in Europe during the Great Depression.

Popular culture
French movie director Alain Resnais told the story in the 1974 movie Stavisky, featuring Jean-Paul Belmondo with the title role and Anny Duperey as his wife Arlette.

In Forces occultes, a movie commissioned in 1942 by the "Propaganda Abteilung", a delegation of Nazi Germany's propaganda ministry within occupied France, Stavisky was presented as both a Freemason and a crook.

Hollywood released a depiction in 1937 with Stolen Holiday, featuring Claude Rains as Stavisky's fictional counterpart, Stefan Orloff, and Kay Francis as his wife. Stolen Holiday asserted unequivocally that Orloff was shot by police and his death made to look like a suicide.

The affair also forms part of the background of the events in J. Robert Janes "Kaleidoscope", one of the Kohler & St. Cyre mystery novels.

See also
 Interwar France
 Straperlo, a 1935 scandal with one of its locations in San Sebastián that scandalized the Second Spanish Republic.
 Bankruptcy of FTX, a 2022 scandal involving cryptocurrency and center leftist politicians that similarly provoked anti-Semitic rhetoric.

Notes

Sources
 Alfred Cobban, A History of Modern France, vol. 3: 1871–1962 (1965). Penguin Books. (No ISBN)
 Janet Flanner (Genêt), Paris was Yesterday, (1972), articles from The New Yorker, 1925–1939. 
 Paul Jankowski, Stavisky – A Confidence Man in the Republic of Virtue, (2002) 
 Large, David Clay, Between Two Fires: Europe's Path in the 1930s (W. W. Norton: 1990) pp. 24–58, a scholarly account

1934 in France
Fraud in France
Political scandals in France
French Third Republic
Embezzlement
Bayonne